Matthew Edgar Parkinson (born 14 September 1972) is a former English cricketer. Parkinson was a right-handed batsman who bowled right-arm medium pace.  He was born at Lancaster, Lancashire.

Parkinson made his Minor Counties Championship debut for Cambridgeshire against Cumberland in 1996.  The following season he made his second and final Championship appearance for the county against Staffordshire.

In 1999, he made his debut in List A cricket for the Lancashire Cricket Board against the Netherlands in the 1999 NatWest Trophy, in what would be his only List A appearance for the side.

In 2000, he moved back south to play a single List A match for Cambridgeshire against Hertfordshire in the 2000 NatWest Trophy.  In his two List A matches, he scored 25 runs at a batting average of 25.00, with a high score of 20.

References

External links 
 

1972 births
Living people
Cricketers from Lancaster, Lancashire
English cricketers
Cambridgeshire cricketers
Lancashire Cricket Board cricketers